The huge moth family Noctuidae contains the following genera:

A B C D E F G H I J K L M N O P Q R S T U V W X Y Z

Gaala
Gabara
Gaberasa
Gabyna
Gadera
Gaedeodes
Gaedonea
Galactomoia
Galanda
Galapha
Galeana
Galgula
Galleridia
Gammace
Gangra
Gaphara
Gargaza
Gaurenopsis
Gelenipsa
Geniascota
Geometrimima
Gerarctia
Gerbathodes
Gerespa
Geria
Gerisa
Geroda
Gerra
Gerrodes
Gesonia
Gespanna
Gigaglossa
Gigia
Gigides
Ginaea
Giria
Girpa
Girtesma
Giscala
Gisira
Giubicolanta
Gizama
Glaucicodia
Glenopteris
Gloanna
Globosusa
Gloia
Gloriana
Glossodice
Glympis
Gnamptocera
Gnamptogyia
Gnamptonyx
Gnathogonia
Godasa
Goednes
Goenycta
Gomora
Gonagyra
Gondysia
Gonelydna
Gonepatica
Gonepteronia
Goniapteryx
Goniocarsia
Goniocraspedon
Goniocraspedum
Goniohelia
Goniophila
Goniophylla
Gonioscia
Goniotermasia
Gonippa
Gonitis
Gonodes
Gonodonta
Gonodontodes
Gonoglasa
Gonophaea
Gonopteronia
Gonospileia
Gonostygia
Gonuris
Goonallica
Gorgone
Gorgora
Gorosina
Gortyna
Gortynodes
Gorua
Gracillina
Gracilodes
Gracilopsis
Grammesia
Grammodes
Grammoscelis
Graphania
Graphantha
Graphigona
Graphiphora
Graptocullia
Graptolitha
Gravodos
Griposia
Grisana
Grisyigoga
Grotella
Grotellaforma
Grumia
Gryphadena
Gryphopogon
Gueselderia
Guntia
Guriauna
Gustiana
Gymnelia
Gynaephila
Gyophora
Gypsitea
Gyrognatha
Gyrohypsoma
Gyroprora
Gyrospilara
Gyrtona

References 

 Natural History Museum Lepidoptera genus database

 
Noctuid genera G